Miłaków may refer to the following places:
Miłaków, Łódź Voivodeship (central Poland)
Miłaków, Lubusz Voivodeship (west Poland)
Miłaków, Świętokrzyskie Voivodeship (south-central Poland)